Jan Betrand Latham-Koenig,  (born 1953) is a British conductor. He was born in England, coming from French, Danish and Polish origins. He attended Highgate School and then studied at the Royal College of Music in London before he founded the Koenig Ensemble in 1976 and began his career as a concert conductor with the BBC, in 1981 and winning the Gulbenkian Fellowship. He made his debut with Macbeth at the Vienna State Opera in 1988 and was appointed its permanent guest conductor in 1991.

His guest appearances in opera and concert have included the Royal Opera House Covent Garden, English National Opera, New Japan Philharmonic, Tokyo Metropolitan Orchestra, Orchestre Philharmonique de Radio France, Orchestre National Bordeaux Aquitaine, Netherlands Radio Philharmonic, Orchestra dell'Arena di Verona, Los Angeles Philharmonic, Dresden Philharmonic, Rundfunk-Sinfonieorchester Berlin and the orchestras of Westdeutscher Rundfunk, Mitteldeutscher Rundfunk, Sudwestfunk and Baden-Baden in Germany. His appearances with the Accademia di Santa Cecilia in Rome have included the Beethoven Piano Concertos with Evgeny Kissin.

As an opera conductor, his appearances include La traviata (Royal Opera House London), Macbeth (Savonlinna Festival); Tristan und Isolde and Thaïs (Novaya Opera Moscow); Tristan und Isolde and Orfeo ed Euridice (National Opera Prague); Otello (New National Theatre Tokyo); Il viaggio a Reims (Finnish National Opera);  I puritani (Vienna Staatsoper); Billy Budd (Gothenburg Opera); Venus and Adonis (Teatro Carlo Felice Genova); Tosca (Opéra National de Paris); La figlia del mago (Cantiere Internazionale d'Arte); Jenůfa and Hamlet (Royal Danish Opera); the Chilean première of Peter Grimes and I Lombardi (Orquesta Filarmónica del Teatro Municipal de Santiago). Additional performances have included Dialogues des Carmélites (BBC Proms, Teatro Colon, Buenos Aires, Opéra national du Rhin), the latter winning the Claude-Rostand Best Regional Production Prize 1999 and the Diapason d’or for best opera video 2001. He has also made some recordings.

He was Music Director with ensembles and organisations including the Orchestra of Porto (which he founded at the request of the Portuguese government), the Cantiere Internazionale d’Arte di Montepulciano, Teatro Massimo di Palermo and both the Orchestre Philharmonique and the Opéra in Strasbourg. He has held Principal Guest Conductorships with Opéra national du Rhin, Teatro dell'Opera di Roma, Filarmonica del Teatro Regio di Torino and he was founder and Artistic Director of the Young Janáček Philharmonic.

Since August 2011 he is Artistic Director of the Novaya Opera, Moscow, being the first British-born conductor to have held such a role in a Russian opera company. Also, at present, he is Artistic Director of the Orquesta Filarmónica de la UNAM, Mexico City and the Flanders Symphony Orchestra, Bruges. In 2019 he founded the Britten Shostakovich Festival Orchestra, a collaborative venture composed of young British and Russian musicians.

Latham-Koenig was appointed Officer of the Order of the British Empire (OBE) in the 2020 Birthday Honours for services to music and UK/Russia cultural relations.

References

British male conductors (music)
Alumni of the Royal College of Music
People educated at Highgate School
Living people
1953 births
21st-century British conductors (music)
21st-century British male musicians
Officers of the Order of the British Empire
English people of French descent
English people of Polish descent
English people of Danish descent
English people of Mauritian descent
English conductors (music)